The 2001 SMU Mustangs football team represented Southern Methodist University (SMU) as a member the Western Athletic Conference (WAC) during the 2001 NCAA Division I-A football season. Led by Mike Cavan in his fifth and final season as head coach, the Mustangs compiled an overall record of 4–7 with a mark of 4–4 in conference play, placing sixth in the WAC.

Schedule

Roster

References

SMU
SMU Mustangs football seasons
SMU Mustangs football